Olfactory receptor 5A1 is a protein that in humans is encoded by the OR5A1 gene.

Olfactory receptors interact with odorant molecules in the nose, to initiate a neuronal response that triggers the perception of a smell. The olfactory receptor proteins are members of a large family of G-protein-coupled receptors (GPCR) arising from single coding-exon genes. Olfactory receptors share a 7-transmembrane domain structure with many neurotransmitter and hormone receptors and are responsible for the recognition and G protein-mediated transduction of odorant signals. The olfactory receptor gene family is the largest in the genome. The nomenclature assigned to the olfactory receptor genes and proteins for this organism is independent of other organisms.

Genetic differences
A single-nucleotide polymorphism in the OR5A1 receptor (rs6591536) causes very significant differences in the odor perception of beta-ionone, both in sensitivity and also in subjective quality. Individuals who contain at least one G allele are sensitive to beta-ionone and perceive a pleasant floral scent, while individuals who are homozygous AA are ~100 times less sensitive and at higher concentrations perceive a pungent sour/vinegar odor instead.

See also
 Olfactory receptor

References

Further reading

External links 
 

Olfactory receptors